Slednevo is a rural locality (a village) and the administrative center of Slednevskoye Rural Settlement, Alexandrovsky District, Vladimir Oblast, Russia. The population was 450 as of 2010. There are 7 streets.

Geography 
Slednevo is located 10 km west of Alexandrov (the district's administrative centre) by road. Kalinino is the nearest rural locality.

References 

Rural localities in Alexandrovsky District, Vladimir Oblast